Westbury Manor Museum is the main town centre museum located at 84 West Street, Fareham, Hampshire, England. It features a variety of exhibits on local history, such as the use of Fareham red bricks in the construction of the Royal Albert Hall. It also has a small café and gift shop.

The museum is housed in an 18th-century Grade II* listed building with formal Victorian style gardens to the rear, formerly used as the offices of Fareham Urban District from 1934 to 1976. Westbury Manor Museum opened in 1990.

In 2014 ownership of the museum was transferred to the Hampshire Cultural Trust as part of a larger transfer of museums from Hampshire County Council and Winchester City Council.

References

External links
 Westbury Manor Museum - Hampshire Cultural Trust site
 A brief history of Westbury Manor

Fareham
Grade II listed buildings in Hampshire
Museums in Hampshire
Local museums in Hampshire
Tourist attractions in Hampshire
Museums established in 1990